Świniec is a river of Poland. It has the Niemica, Wołcza and Stuchowska Struga as tributaries, and terminates into the Kamieński Lagoon, which is connected to the Baltic Sea by the Dziwna.

Rivers of Poland
Rivers of West Pomeranian Voivodeship